Escuela de Iniciación San Martín (English: School of Initiation San Martín) is a Spanish football club based in Sotrondio, San Martín del Rey Aurelio in the autonomous community of Asturias. Founded in 2012, San Martín plays its home games at Estadio El Florán.

History

Following the dissolution of Club Deportivo San Martín, founded in 1950, because of its financial trouble, former members of the club decided to create a new team with the name of Escuela de Inicación San Martín in July 2012.

After a first season in the last division where the club finished without losses, in May 2017, the club was promoted to Tercera División after three promotions in five years.

Season to season

4 seasons in Tercera División
1 season in Tercera División RFEF

References

External links

Football clubs in Asturias
Association football clubs established in 2012
2012 establishments in Spain